The Intel Extreme Masters Season XIII – Katowice Major 2019, also known as IEM Katowice Major 2019 or Katowice 2019, was the fourteenth Counter-Strike: Global Offensive Major Championship and the world championship for the thirteenth season of the Intel Extreme Masters. It was held in Katowice, Silesian Voivodeship, Poland from February 13 – March 3, 2019. Fourteen teams would qualify for the IEM Katowice Major 2019 based on their top fourteen placements from the last Major, the FACEIT Major: London 2018, while another ten teams would qualify from their respective regional qualifiers.  The top eight teams from the London Major ("Legends") received a bye to the second phase of the group stage while the other sixteen teams ("Challengers") had to go through the first and second group stages in order to reach the playoffs. It featured a  prize pool, the seventh consecutive Major with that prize pool. It was hosted by ESL, their first Major since 2016. This event was the start of the second season of the Intel Grand Slam.

Astralis, Team Liquid, MIBR, Natus Vincere, and FaZe Clan were incoming Legends who retained that status, while BIG, HellRaisers, and compLexity Gaming were knocked out in the New Legends stage. Renegades, Ninjas in Pyjamas, and ENCE advanced to the playoff stage to become Legends for the following Major.

The grand finals featured the world's number one team Astralis, which defeated Ninjas in Pyjamas and MIBR in the playoffs, and the underdog ENCE, which defeated the world's number two in Team Liquid and the world's number three in Natus Vincere. Astralis swept ENCE in two maps to take its third Major title and tie Fnatic for most Majors titles. In addition, Astralis became just the third team after Fnatic and the Brazilian roster of Luminosity Gaming and SK Gaming to win consecutive Majors.

Background
Counter-Strike: Global Offensive (CS:GO) is a multiplayer first-person shooter video game developed by Hidden Path Entertainment and Valve. It is the fourth game in the Counter-Strike series. In professional CS:GO, the Valve-sponsored Majors are the most prestigious tournaments.

The defending champions were Astralis, after winning their second championship at the FACEIT Major: London 2018. At the time, Fnatic had the most Major titles, with three.

Format
The Major cycle began with four Minors, or regional qualifiers: Americas, Asia, CIS, and Europe. Two teams from each qualifier moved on to the Major. In addition, because Valve reduced the number of direct Major invites from sixteen to fourteen, the third-place teams at each respective Minor advanced to a third-place qualifier to send two more teams to the Major.

The Major featured twenty-four teams. The top eight teams from the FACEIT Major: London 2018 were the Legends, and the remaining sixteen teams—the teams that placed ninth through fourteenth at the FACEIT Major and the ten teams that advanced from the Minors—were known as Challengers. 

The Major was split into three stages. The first stage was the New Challengers stage, featuring all Challengers in a Swiss-system tournament: the top eight teams advanced to the next stage and the bottom eight teams were eliminated. The second stage is the New Legends stage, a second Swiss-system group stage. This stage featured the eight Legends from the London Major and the eight teams advancing from the New Challengers stage. Like the New Challengers stage, the New Legends stage also advanced the top eight teams and eliminated the bottom eight teams. All teams from this stage except the bottom two teams earned automatic invites to the following Major. The final stage was the New Champions stage, and teams that advanced to this stage received Legends status at the following Major. This stage featured an eight team, best-of-three, single elimination bracket.

ESL announced changes for this Major in the New Challengers and the New Legends stages. Rather than only featuring best-of-threes in the fifth round of the group stages, ESL announced that any progression or elimination matches would feature a best-of-three series. Therefore, the high and low matches of round three and all matches in rounds four and five were best-of-three. ESL also made changes to the seeding protocol. Instead of having seeding determined by placement at the last Major and the Minors, each team in the Swiss-system stages ranked the other 15 teams in the stage; the rankings were then aggregated to create the final seeding for the first round of each Swiss-system stage. ESL also moved away from FACEIT's Buchholz system and instead used an Elo rating system. Teams were assigned Elo ratings that matched their seeding and the rating changed after every win or loss, with the winner taking some of the loser's points. Each team's Elo rating was used to determine all matchups after the first round, instead of the random draws of previous Majors.

Map Pool
The map pool remained the same as the previous Major.

Minors
Each regional qualifier, called "Minors", featured eight teams. Each Minor also had a 50,000 prize pool, with first place receiving 30,000, second place taking in 15,000, and third place raking in the last 5,000. Unlike past Minors, no teams was directly invited to the Minors. All Minors take place in Katowice to avoid visa issues, just like the FACEIT Major approach.

Each Minor's format was similar to past Minors, but with a couple small changes. The group stages would be a GSL, double elimination format with each group featuring four teams. The opening matches would be a best of one. A new change came along with the winner's set being a best of three instead of the usual best of one. The loser's and decider's matches would also be best of three sets. The top two teams in each group would move on to a four team, best of three, double elimination bracket. The top two teams would move on to the Major. In addition, the Minor finals that used to determine seeding would be eliminated; instead, the winner of the winner's match would be the first seed going into the New Challengers stage and the winner of the loser's match would be the second seed.

CIS Minor
The CIS Minor qualifier featured sixteen teams. Winstrike Team was automatically invited based on its top sixteen placement at the FACEIT Major and another seven teams were invited. Eight more teams qualified through four online qualifiers. The qualifier will have a sixteen team, double elimination bracket and teams will play until eight teams qualified CIS Minor.

The CIS Minor took place from January 16 to 20, 2019.

Europe Minor
The Europe Minor qualifier featured sixteen teams. mousesports were automatically invited based on their top sixteen placement at the FACEIT Major and another seven teams were invited. Eight more teams qualified through four online qualifiers. The qualifier had a sixteen team, double elimination bracket and teams played until eight teams qualified for the Europe Minor.

The Europe Minor took place from January 16 to 20, 2019. ENCE and Team Vitality qualified for the main qualifier.

Asia Minor
The Asia Minor featured two teams from Oceania, two teams from China, two teams from East Asia, one team from Southeast Asia, and one team from the Middle East. Each qualifier featured four invited teams and another four teams through two online qualifiers. Each qualifier consist of an eight team, double elimination, best of three bracket. MVP PK was the first team to qualify for any Katowice 2019 Minor after defeating compatriot GOSU and Renegades rounded up the Asia Minor lineup after defeating Tainted Minds.

The Asia Minor will take place from January 22 to 26, 2019.

Americas Minor
The Americas Minor featured two qualifiers, one from North America and one from South America. The North America qualifier featured sixteen teams. Eight teams were invited and another eight teams qualified through four online qualifiers. The qualifier would have a sixteen team, double elimination bracket and teams would play until six teams qualified for the Americas Minor. The South America qualifier featured eight teams. Four teams were invited and another four teams qualified through two online qualifiers. This qualifier have an eight team, double elimination, best of three bracket. Teams would play until two teams qualified for the Minor.

The Americas Minor took place from January 22 to 26, 2019, the same dates as the Asia Minor.

Minor play-in
This qualifier featured the teams that placed third in their respective Minors. This phase was a four team, best of three, double elimination bracket. The opening matches were the Asia Minor representative against the Europe Minor representative and the CIS Minor team versus the Americans Minor team.

The Minor play-in took place on January 27, 2019.

Broadcast talent
The Major was streamed in various languages across Twitch. It was also streamed on ESL's YouTube channel, Steam.tv, and on CS:GO's in-game viewing client GOTV.

Desk hosts
 Alex "Machine" Richardson
 Tres "stunna" Saranthus

Stage host
 OJ Borg

Reporter
 Frankie Ward

Commentators
 Henry "HenryG" Greer
 Vince Hill
 Jason "moses" O'Toole
 Matthew "Sadokist" Trivett

Analysts
 Chad "SPUNJ" Burchill
 Sean "seang@res" Gares
 Jacob "Pimp" Winneche

Observers
 Connor "Sliggy" Blomfield
 Heather "sapphiRe" Garozzo
 David "Prius" Kuntz
 Alex "Rushly" Rush

Teams competing

Pre-Major ranking
HLTV.org rank teams based on results of teams' performances. The rankings shown below reflect the February 11, 2019 rankings.

Teams that were in the top 30 but failed to qualify for the major include North (#7, Denmark), mousesports (#10, Europe), Ghost Gaming (#16, United States), Valiance (#20, Serbia), 3DMAX (#24, France), Heroic (#25, Denmark), forZe (#26, Russia), Luminosity Gaming (#27, Brazil), Sprout Esports (#29, Germany), and x6tence Galaxy (#30, Sweden).

1Change since September 24, 2018 ranking, the ranking after the FACEIT Major.

2Since end of FACEIT Major

3Best major placements may not necessarily reflect teams' current rosters

New Challengers stage
The New Challengers stage took place from February 13 to February 17, 2019, at the ESL Arena. The Challengers stage, also known as the Preliminary stage and formerly known as the offline qualifier, was a sixteen team swiss tournament. The seeding was released on February 6, 2019. Next to each team's name under the "Team" column is each team's initial seeding. Under each of the "Rounds" columns are the team's opponent's seed at the time the round was played.

New Legends stage
The New Legends stage, formerly known as the Group stage, used the same format as the Challengers stage. This stage takes place from February 20 to February 24, 2019, live at the International Congress Center in Katowice. The seeding was released on February 19, 2019. Next to each team's name under the "Team" column is each team's initial seeding. Under each of the "Rounds" columns are the team's opponent's seed at the time the round was played.

New Champions stage
The New Champions Stage, also known as the Playoffs, is a best of three double elimination bracket. Teams play until a winner is decided. This stage is taking place at the Spodek from February 28 to March 3, 2019. Brackets were revealed shortly after FaZe defeated Cloud9 in the last map of the group stages. Teams were seeded first based on their record in the New Legends stage and based on the strength of their schedule.

Bracket

Quarterfinals

Natus Vincere vs. FaZe Clan

Casters: HenryG & Sadokist

Team Liquid vs. ENCE eSports

Casters: Vince Hill & moses

MIBR vs. Renegades

Casters: HenryG & Sadokist

Astralis vs. Ninjas in Pyjamas

Casters: Vince Hill & moses

Semifinals

Natus Vincere vs. ENCE eSports

Casters: HenryG & Sadokist

MIBR vs. Astralis

Casters: Vince Hill & moses

Finals

Casters: HenryG & Sadokist

Final standings
The final placings are shown below. In addition, the prize distribution, seed for the next major, roster, and coaches are shown. Each team's in-game leader is shown first.

Post-Major ranking
The rankings shown below reflect the March 4, 2019 rankings, the first ranking after the Major.

1Change since February 11, 2019 ranking

References

2019 first-person shooter tournaments
Counter-Strike: Global Offensive Majors
Intel Extreme Masters